HMS Inconstant was an I-class destroyer built for the Turkish Navy, but was purchased by the Royal Navy in 1939.

Description
The I-class ships were improved versions of the preceding H-class. They were powered by two Parsons geared steam turbines, each driving one propeller shaft, using steam provided by three Admiralty three-drum boilers. Their crew numbered 145 officers and ratings.

The Turkish ships mounted four 4.7-inch (120 mm) Mark IX guns in single mounts, designated 'A', 'B', 'X' and 'Y' from bow to stern. While under construction, their anti-aircraft (AA) armament was augmented by a single 12-pounder AA gun that replaced the planned aft set of torpedo tubes. In addition the intended pair of quadruple mounts for the 0.5 inch Vickers Mark III machine gun were replaced by a pair of  Oerlikon light AA guns. They were fitted with a single above-water quadruple torpedo tube mount amidships for  torpedoes. One depth charge rack and two throwers were fitted for 35 depth charges. The Turkish ships were fitted with the ASDIC sound detection system to locate submarines underwater and a Type 286 search radar.

Construction and career
Inconstant was laid down as TCG Muavenet for the Turkish Navy by Vickers Armstrong at their Barrow-in-Furness shipyard on 24 May 1939, purchased in September 1939 by the Royal Navy, launched on 24 February 1941 and commissioned on 24 January 1942. Inconstant was returned to Turkey on 9 March 1946 and renamed Muavenet. She was discarded in 1960.

Notes

Bibliography

External links
 IWM Interview with John Eaden, who commanded HMS Inconstant in 1943

 

Demirhisar-class destroyers
I-class destroyers of the Royal Navy
Ships built in Barrow-in-Furness
1941 ships
World War II destroyers of the United Kingdom